"Tell Me It's Real" is a song recorded by American R&B duo K-Ci & JoJo. The track was produced for K-Ci and JoJo's second studio album, It's Real (1999). The song spent 20 weeks on the Hot 100, peaking at number two behind Christina Aguilera's "Genie in a Bottle". In the UK, the song initially charted at number 40, but a re-release the following year containing UK garage mixes charted 24 places higher at number 16.

Track listing
UK 12"
A1. "Tell Me It's Real" (Album Version) – 4:42
A2. "Tell Me It's Real" (Club Asylum Steppers Mix) – 5:57
B1. "Tell Me It's Real" (Full Crew Remix) – 4:52
B2. "Tell Me It's Real" (Dave 'Jam' Hall Remix) – 4:20
B3. "Tell Me It's Real" (Astro Trax Team Master Mix) – 7:10

UK CD single
 "Tell Me It's Real" (Club Asylum Vocal Edit) – 3:36
 "Tell Me It's Real" (Club Asylum Steppers Mix) – 5:58
 "Tell Me It's Real" (Gridlock Mix) – 5:32
 "Tell Me It's Real" (Original Album Version) – 4:38
 Video	– 3:36

UK 12" Remixes (2000)
A. "Tell Me It's Real" (Club Asylum Steppers Mix) – 7:40
AA1. "Tell Me It's Real" (Tee Bone Dub Mix) – 5:58
AA2. "Tell Me It's Real" (Tee Bone Vocal Mix) – 5:23

Charts

Weekly charts

Year-end charts

References 

1998 songs
1999 singles
K-Ci & JoJo songs
AM PM Records singles
MCA Records singles
Contemporary R&B ballads
UK garage songs
Songs written by K-Ci